List of military units raised by the state of Kansas during the American Civil War (1861–1865).

Artillery

Cavalry

Infantry

Militia

See also

 Lists of American Civil War regiments by state
 United States Colored Troops

References

External links 
 The Civil War Archive

 
Kansas in the American Civil War
Kansas
Civil War